This is a list of notable dishes made using coconut milk. Coconut milk is the liquid that comes from the grated meat of a coconut. The color and rich taste of the milk can be attributed to the high oil content. Most of the fat is saturated fat. Coconut milk is a very popular food ingredient used in Southeast Asia, especially in Cambodia, Thailand, Malaysia, Indonesia, Singapore, and the Philippines and in South Asia, specifically in Sri Lanka and South India.

Dishes that use coconut milk

Brazilian

Burmese

Caribbean

Filipino

Hawaiian

Indian

Indian (Tamil Nadu & Kerala)

 Ada Prathaman
 Gothampu Payasam (Wheat Payasam)
 Kerala Curries
 Molugootal (sometimes used in conjunction with fresh grated coconut to enhance flavour)
 Mutton Stew
 Paal-Appam (sweetened coconut milk in the center of the Aapam for taste)
 Parippu Prathaman
 Puttu (Steam cake) Grated coconut is mixed with rice powder for taste

Indian (Goan and Konkani cuisine in Karnataka, and Maharashtra)

Almost all dishes have coconut milk and paste as its base (called as "Aapros" in Konkani)
 Solkadhi
 All vegetable and fish curries
 Coconut Rice
 Payasa, Mangane, Kheer

Indian (Northeast)

 Sunga Saul a dish of the Cuisine of Assam, a state in Northeast India

Indian (North India)
Coconut and coconut milk are both used as a garnish in several traditional dishes across Bihar, Eastern U.P., Uttaranchal and Bundelkhand. Its generally used in dishes made of jackfruit, pumpkin and other gourds.

Indonesian

Malaysian and Singaporean

Maldivian

Sri Lankan

Thai

Vietnamese

Unsorted

 Bajigur
 Bebinca
 Boluo fan
 Bubur kacang hijau
 Chè bà ba
 Coconut milk
 Coquito
 Kalu dodol
 Khanom thuai
 Khao tom mad
 Kiribath
 Kokis
 Mango pomelo sago
 Nasi gurih
 Opor
 Stew peas

See also
 List of coconut dishes

References

External links
 

Coconut milk